The year 1880 in science and technology included many events, some of which are listed here.

Astronomy
 September 30 – American doctor Henry Draper takes the first photograph of the Orion Nebula, from Hastings-on-Hudson, New York; this year he also photographs the spectrum of Jupiter.

Mathematics
 F. Landry finds the largest known Fermat prime, 65537.
 John Venn popularises Venn diagrams.

Medicine
 Moritz Kaposi publishes Pathologie und Therapie der Hautkrankheiten in Vorlesungen für praktische Ärzte und Studierende ("Pathology and treatment of diseases of the skin, for practitioners and students"), a significant textbook in dermatology.
 German professor of pathology Karl Eberth first visualizes the bacteria which will become known as Salmonella in the Peyer's patches and spleens of typhoid patients.
 English surgeon Sampson Gamgee reports on his use of the medical dressing Gamgee Tissue.
 Scottish surgeon William Macewen reports on his use of orotracheal intubation as an alternative to tracheotomy.

Physics
 February 13 – Thomas Edison observes the Edison effect.
 The first demonstration of the direct piezoelectric effect is made by the brothers Pierre Curie and Jacques Curie.
 Johannes Diderik van der Waals formulates the Law of Corresponding States.

Technology
 February 19 – The photophone, an optical speech transmission system, is invented by Alexander Graham Bell and Charles Sumner Tainter in Washington, D.C.
 Dugald Clerk builds the first successful two-stroke engine.

Publications
 February – The journal Science is first published in the United States with financial backing from Thomas Edison.
 Start of publication of Report Of The Scientific Results of the Exploring Voyage of H.M.S. Challenger during the years 1873-76.

Awards
 Copley Medal: James Joseph Sylvester
 Wollaston Medal: Auguste Daubrée

Births
 January 18 – Paul Ehrenfest (died 1933), Austrian physicist and mathematician.
 January 22 – Frigyes Riesz (died 1956), Hungarian mathematician.
 February 17 – Reginald Farrer (died 1920), English botanist.
 June 21 – Arnold Gesell (died 1961), American developmental psychologist.
 June 24 – Oswald Veblen (died 1960), American mathematician.
 August 17 – Paul Kammerer (died 1926), Austrian Lamarckian biologist.
 October 15 – Marie Stopes (died 1958), English paleobotanist and pioneer of birth control.

Deaths
 January 9 – William Budd (born 1811), English physician and epidemiologist.
 May 6 – Friedrich Bayer (born 1825), German manufacturing chemist.
 July 9 – Paul Broca (born 1824), French anthropologist.
 December 31 – John Stenhouse (born 1809), Scottish chemist.
 December 31 - Eric Holmes (born 1821)

References

 
19th century in science
1880s in science